Jose "Buga" Abreu Coliseum (Spanish: Coliseo Jose "Buga" Abreu Méndez) is a sports arena that is located in Isabela, Puerto Rico that seats 5,000 for basketball & volleyball games. The former home for the Isabela Bantams (Spanish: Gallitos de Isabela) men's basketball team and the Isabela Playeras (Spanish: Playeras de Isabela) women's volleyball team.  The Coliseum will host the Taekwwondo events for the 2010 Central American and Caribbean Games.

The coliseum was named after a basketball player, Jose "Buga" Abreu Méndez, who died in a car accident after a Bantams away game during a BSN season in the 1990s.

References

Indoor arenas in Puerto Rico
Basketball venues in Puerto Rico
Isabela, Puerto Rico
2010 Central American and Caribbean Games venues
1996 establishments in Puerto Rico
Volleyball venues in Puerto Rico
Sports venues completed in 1996